Alte Kirche may refer to:

 Alte Kirche (Dresden-Leuben)
 Alte Kirche (Wuppertal-Langerfeld)